Nibelungen Valley is an ice free valley just west of Plane Table and Panorama Peak in the Asgard Range, Victoria Land. Nibelungen is one in a group of mythological names in the range given by New Zealand Antarctic Place-Names Committee (NZ-APC).

Valleys of Victoria Land
McMurdo Dry Valleys